Events from the year 1957 in Belgium

Incumbents
Monarch: Baudouin
Prime Minister: Achille Van Acker

Events
 25 March – Belgium a signatory to the Treaty of Rome establishing the European Economic Community.

Publications
 M. A. Buisseret, The Policy of Belgium in Her Overseas Territories (Brussels, Information and Public Relations Office for the Belgian Congo and Ruanda Urundi)

Births
 22 April – Luc De Schepper, physicist (died 2022)

Deaths
 18 August – Huib Hoste (born 1881), architect
 26 December – Valerius Geerebaert (born 1884), Redemptorist

References

 
Belgium
Years of the 20th century in Belgium
1950s in Belgium
Belgium